Jack Goodman (born September 9, 1973) was a Republican member of the Missouri Senate, representing the 29th District between 2005 and 2012. He is currently a Circuit Judge for the 39th Judicial Circuit, which consists of Stone, Barry, and Lawrence counties.

Biography 
Jack Goodman grew up in Pierce City, Missouri, and graduated from Pierce City High School in 1991. He attended the University of Missouri, where he earned his bachelor's degree in Philosophy in 1995 and his Juris Doctor in 1998.

After graduating from law school, Sen. Goodman served as an assistant prosecuting attorney for Dade County, Missouri until 2002, when he was elected to his first term in the Missouri House. Then-Representative Goodman represented the 132nd District, covering almost all of Lawrence County.  During his three-year House tenure, Sen. Goodman rose in the House ranks to serve as the Assistant Majority Floor Leader.

In the summer of 2005, Senator Larry "Gene" Taylor died less than one year into his first term in the Missouri Senate. Jack Goodman was nominated by the Republican Party to run in the special election to succeed Sen. Taylor. In his first race for the Missouri Senate, Goodman was elected to serve the remainder of that term ending in 2009, beating his Democratic opponent by 35 points .

In the 2008 election, Senator Goodman ran for a second term in the Missouri Senate. No candidate of any party chose to challenge him in his reelection bid. The 29th District, which he represents, includes McDonald, Lawrence, Barry, Stone, Taney and Ozark counties.  Sen. Goodman also represents Branson.

In addition to his duties as Assistant Majority Leader, Sen. Goodman chairs the General Laws committee. He also serves as vice-chair of the Judiciary committee and is a member of the Job, Economic Development, and Local Government; Small Business, Insurance and Industry; and the Select Committee on Oversight of the Federal Stimulus. On the Stimulus Oversight Committee, Sen. Goodman serves as the majority party's point man on stimulus dollars allocated for judicial and law enforcement issues.

In early 2009, U.S. Congressman Roy Blunt announced he would run for the U.S. Senate seat being vacated by the retirement of Senator Christopher "Kit" Bond. Blunt's announcement leaves a vacancy in Missouri's 7th Congressional district in 2010. Senator Jack Goodman has announced his candidacy for the seat and is often mentioned as a leading contender to succeed Rep. Blunt . He currently lives in Mount Vernon, Missouri with his wife, Laura, and two sons, Jack Elliott and William True Goodman.

Major Legislation
During his time in office, Sen. Goodman sponsored several high-profile bills that have gained national attention. Sen. Goodman was the author of Missouri's Castle Doctrine, which allows homeowners to use lethal force against illegal intruders.

The Stop Meth Act was also signed into law and gives law enforcement officials a wider range of tools to respond to the growing domestic production of methamphetamine.  In the 2008 legislative session, Sen. Goodman sponsored Senate Bill 1194, which would allow prosecutors to seek the death penalty for criminals convicted of forcible rape of a child under twelve years of age. This issue had gained national attention since the Supreme Court heard Kennedy v. Louisiana (2008). In 2009, Sen. Goodman introduced an altered version of that bill, which would give life imprisonment without the possibility of parole to any person convicted of forcible rape of a child under twelve years of age.

Congressional Campaign
Senator Goodman announced on February 27, 2009 his intention to run for the United States Congress seat then held by Congressman Roy Blunt.

Goodman finished second in polling behind eventual winner Billy Long with 30,401 votes and 29.1%.

References

External links
39th Judicial Circuit Court
Project Vote Smart - Senator Jack Goodman (MO) profile
Follow the Money - Jack Goodman
2006 2004 2002 campaign contributions

Republican Party Missouri state senators
Republican Party members of the Missouri House of Representatives
Missouri state court judges
1973 births
Living people
People from Aurora, Missouri
People from Pierce City, Missouri
People from Mount Vernon, Missouri